Camilo Villegas (born 7 January 1982) is a Colombian professional golfer who plays on the PGA Tour.

Early years
Villegas was born in Medellín, Colombia, and took up golf as a child. After several different National Junior Championships in Colombia between the ages of 8 and 15, at 16 he became the first player in Colombian golf history to win the Amateur's Grand Slam in the same year: The National Junior Championship (stroke play), the National Junior Championship (match play), the National Amateur Championship, and the Colombian Open in the amateur category. Then, in 2001, he became only the second player to win the Colombian Open as an amateur. His success in Colombian golf throughout the 1990s earned him the distinction of "Player of the Decade" issued by the Colombian Golf Federation.

College career
Villegas accepted an athletic scholarship to attend the University of Florida in Gainesville, Florida, where he played for coach Buddy Alexander's Florida Gators men's golf team in National Collegiate Athletics Association (NCAA) competition from 2001 to 2004. As a freshman in 2001, Villegas was a member of the Gators' 2001 NCAA championship team. During his college golf career, he was the Southeastern Conference (SEC) Freshman of the Year in 2001, the SEC Player of the Year in 2002 and 2004, and an All-American four consecutive years (2001, 2002, 2003, 2004). Villegas graduated from the University of Florida with a bachelor's degree in business administration in 2004.

Villegas is known for his commitment to physical fitness, and says his mentor and inspiration is golf icon Gary Player. Villegas and Player have starred together in a MasterCard "priceless" commercial.

In the June 2006 issue of Golf Digest, Villegas was named "the sexiest player on tour, Tiger Woods included." He has also gained notoriety for sporting flashy dress clothing by designer J. Lindeberg.

An alumnus of the University of Florida, Villegas frequently visits the university's Mark Bostick Golf Course when he is spending time at his residence in Gainesville, Florida.

His younger brother, Manuel, also played on the University of Florida team and now plays on the Korn Ferry Tour.

Professional career

Villegas began playing on the PGA Tour in 2004 and earned his PGA Tour card just prior to the 2006 season. He had a blistering start to his 2006 rookie year on tour, with two second-place finishes and a third place (at The Players Championship) in his first nine events. He barely missed qualifying into the 2006 Masters Tournament in his rookie year, being just a single position on the PGA Tour money list (11th) under the requirement. He made his first Masters appearance in 2007 by finishing in the top 40 of the PGA Tour money list for 2006. He qualified for the 2008 Masters through his play during the inaugural FedEx Cup playoff system, that included an opening round 63 (8 under par) at the Deutsche Bank Championship, and three straight top 10 finishes. He entered the FedEx Cup playoffs in 52nd place and improved to 28th place through his play in the first three events, thus qualifying for the 30-man field at The Tour Championship in Atlanta, Georgia, where he finished in the top 10 for the third straight week and finished 24th on the FedEx Cup points list.

Villegas won his second professional event at the Coca-Cola Tokai Classic on the Japan Golf Tour in September 2007. By doing so, he earned ¥24,000,000 (approximately US$208,272). He shot a score of 282 (−2) and defeated Toyokazu Fujishima in a playoff by draining a 20-foot putt on the winning hole. Villegas won his third professional event at the TELUS Skins Game in June 2008 where he defeated a field that included Greg Norman, Colin Montgomerie, Mike Weir and "Mr. Skins", Fred Couples. Villegas took six skins for $130,000 with a short birdie putt on the 14th hole, and then won an additional four skins for $100,000 in a playoff, which was decided with a closest-to-the-pin shootout from 130 yards out on the 18th hole.

Villegas recorded a record-breaking second round in the 2008 Open Championship. He shot 65, which was the lowest score for any Open Championship second round at Royal Birkdale. He started off with two bogeys but ended with five consecutive birdies which put him at 5 under for his round. Villegas won his first PGA Tour title in September 2008, winning the BMW Championship by two shots over Dudley Hart. For the last 44 holes of the tournament, Villegas did not three putt, one-putting 27 of those last 44 holes. This victory took him to a career high of 18th in the Official World Golf Rankings.

Villegas followed his BMW Championship win with a victory in The Tour Championship. He defeated Sergio García in a playoff, having trailed by five shots going into the final round. The win took Villegas to a career-high 7th place in the Official World Golf Rankings and established him as the highest ranked golfer from South America. He finished the season 7th on the PGA Tour money list.

In late 2008, Villegas joined the European Tour, making his first European Tour appearance at the 2008 HSBC Champions, the first tournament of the 2009 season. However he continued to play predominately in the United States. He had no victories in 2009, but had five top-10 finishes and ended the season ranked 45th on the PGA Tour money list and in the top 30 of the European Tour's Race to Dubai.

He has spent over 30 weeks in the top-10 of the Official World Golf Rankings since 2008, with a career high rank of seventh. At the 2009 Chevron World Challenge, Villegas made a very rare albatross (double eagle) on a 568-yard par 5, firing a 262-yard second shot into the hole.

In March 2010, Villegas earned his third victory on the PGA Tour, winning The Honda Classic by five strokes over Anthony Kim. He chose not to maintain his status on the European Tour, and a slump in form in 2012 meant he had to enter the PGA Tour's Qualifying School at the end of the season; he finished 144th on the money list. Villegas did not regain a Tour Card, but had conditional status on the PGA Tour for 2013, playing in the 126-150 category. His status gave him entry based on sponsor exemptions, past championships, and priority ranking. He regained full privileges for 2014 with a 110th-place finish in the FedEx Cup. In 2014, Villegas won the Wyndham Championship, his first win on Tour in more than four years. The win moved him into the 37th position of the 2014 FedEX Cup prior to going into the FedEx Cup playoffs. With this victory, Villegas earned an invitation for the 2015 Masters Tournament, and a two-year exemption on the PGA Tour, lasting until the 2015-16 season.

In July 2016, Villegas withdrew from the Olympics in Rio to concentrate in the PGA Tour and secure a card for the 2016-17 season. He also mentioned concerns over the Zika virus as another reason to pull out from the Olympics. Villegas did not regain his Tour card and played the 2016–17 season with only past champion status. He eventually played well enough to regain his PGA Tour privileges for the 2017–18 season.

Pronouncing his name
Throughout the PGA Tour and among the media, there is a debate over how Villegas's name should be pronounced.
 In Spanish, Villegas is pronounced "bee-YAY-gahss" or "bee-JAY-gahss." The official language in Colombia is Spanish. For more on the ambiguity of this pronunciation, see Yeísmo.
 Recent examples from discussion forums, television coverage and sports articles—including interviews with Villegas himself—have supported the standard pronunciation of "bee-JAY-gahss" for his last name, although there are some who have not yet adopted the proper first name pronunciation, "kah-MEE-lo."

Personal life
Villegas is often compared with Spider-Man for his unique style of reading greens before he putts. He leans himself all the way to the putting surface, stretching out his left leg while balancing himself on his right leg, getting his chest and head almost to the ground, from which he reads his putts.

On 26 July 2020, Villegas' 22-month-old daughter Mía died after battling tumours on her brain and spine. Following her death, the PGA Tour paid tribute to her in the following tournaments, including the PGA Championship, and the Wyndham Championship, by giving players small rainbow pins for their caps, as Camilo revealed Mia's immense love for rainbows. Many players continued wearing the pins in their caps for the rest of the season, and Villegas received tremendous support within the PGA community, the sporting world, and his fans in Colombia.

Despite the tragedy, Villegas said in a heartfelt interview that he would try to reconnect himself with the game of golf, and return to form, stating that "despite not being able to change what has happened, we will try to seek the future, with the memory of Mia by our side". A month after her death, Villegas made a return to competitive golf; making starts in Korn Ferry Tour tournaments, to the acclaim of his fellow competitors.

Amateur wins
2002 Mexican Open
2003 Players Amateur

Professional wins (10)

PGA Tour wins (4)

PGA Tour playoff record (1–2)

Japan Golf Tour wins (1)

Japan Golf Tour playoff record (1–0)

South American wins (1)
2001 Colombian Open (as an amateur)

Other wins (4)

*Note: The 2008 CVS Caremark Charity Classic was stopped after 28 holes due to heavy rain.

Other playoff record (1–0)

Results in major championships

CUT = missed the half-way cut
"T" = tied

Summary

Most consecutive cuts made – 12 (2008 U.S. Open – 2011 Masters)
Longest streak of top-10s – 1 (three times)

Results in The Players Championship

CUT = missed the halfway cut
"T" indicates a tie for a place

Results in World Golf Championships
Results not in chronological order before 2015.

QF, R16, R32, R64 = Round in which player lost in match play
"T" = tied
Note that the HSBC Champions did not become a WGC event until 2009.

Team appearances
Amateur
Eisenhower Trophy (representing Colombia): 1998, 2000, 2002

Professional
World Cup (representing Colombia): 2006, 2011
Wendy's 3-Tour Challenge (representing PGA Tour): 2007
Presidents Cup (International team): 2009

See also

2005 Nationwide Tour graduates
List of Florida Gators men's golfers on the PGA Tour
List of University of Florida alumni

References

External links

Why Camilo Villegas is the Man
"Here comes the Spider-Man" by Connell Barrett, GOLF.com

Colombian male golfers
Florida Gators men's golfers
PGA Tour golfers
European Tour golfers
Korn Ferry Tour graduates
Sportspeople from Medellín
1982 births
Living people
21st-century Colombian people